Ernest Ray Willis (b. c. 1945 - January 7, 2021) was an American man who spent 17 years on death row for murder by arson before being exonerated in 2004.

Convicted of murder after two women died in a fire in his West Texas home, Willis was sentenced to death in 1987. In 1991, another person confessed to starting the fire, but this could not be corroborated. Subsequent interest in the case led to new investigations into the origin of the fire that determined that there was absolutely no evidence of arson.

Willis's conviction was overturned and he was released from prison in 2004. He is believed to be the longest-serving innocent inmate of a death row in the United States.

Background
Willis was from New Mexico. Before he was 40 years old, he had been divorced several times, and he had back problems that prevented him from working and made him dependent on food stamps. He developed an addiction to pain medication, and he had three convictions for driving under the influence. Willis had moved to Odessa, Texas, to live with his cousin, Billy Willis. They later moved to the town of Iraan, Texas.

On the night of June 10, 1986, Willis and his cousin Billy came home with two women that they had met that day, Betsy Beleu and Gail Allison. Ernest Willis said that he awoke to the smell of smoke around 4:00 a.m. on June 11. The Willis cousins were able to make it out of the burning house, but the flames had pushed Willis back when he tried to rescue Beleu and Allison. Both women died in the fire. Police became suspicious of Ernest, and they arrested him four months later, charging him with murder.

Willis first raised the suspicions of police with his behavior at the scene of the fire. He was smoking as firefighters extinguished the fire, he did not seem to have inhaled much smoke, and his feet were not burned as officers thought they would have been. Later, Willis failed a polygraph examination. Given that there was only circumstantial evidence, prosecutors were surprised when they were able to secure a capital murder indictment against him.

Trial and imprisonment
At trial, Willis appeared cold and emotionless, and prosecutors commented to the jury about his demeanor. Willis did not realize that his behavior was abnormal; after his arrest, for reasons that were unclear, he had been started on high doses of antipsychotic medication. These medications can be associated with an apathetic appearance. Willis was convicted of capital murder and sent to death row in August 1987.

In 1990, fellow death row inmate David Martin Long gave a three-hour confession to starting the fire in Iraan. He had been involved in some criminal activity with Billy Willis, and he said that he hated Billy. The confession was recorded on video, but Long subsequently refused to testify in court on the matter. The confession generated new interest in the case among Willis's appeals lawyers, and they worked to confirm the information in Long's story. The crime scene evidence indicated that liquor such as Everclear and Wild Turkey could have been used as accelerants as Long claimed. Long seemed a plausible suspect because he had admitted to starting a mobile home fire in Bay City, Texas. That 1983 blaze resulted in the death of Long's former boss.

Willis met his wife, Verilyn Harbin, while he was on death row. Harbin was the sister of death row inmate Ricky McGinn, who in June 2000 had been the first Texas inmate to receive a stay of execution from governor George W. Bush. (Bush declined to halt 131 earlier executions during his tenure.) Willis and Harbin corresponded and later met at McGinn's insistence. McGinn was executed in September 2000, and Willis and Harbin were married a month after the execution.

As his appeals went by, Willis said that he became depressed and stopped exercising. Willis weighed 185 pounds when he went to prison, and his weight eventually reached 300 pounds.

Exoneration
After many years of trying to corroborate Long's story, his confession could not be fully supported by the evidence. However, the interest generated by the confession led to new investigations into the Willis case. In 2004, a U.S. district judge threw out the conviction, ruling that Willis had been unnecessarily drugged during his trial and that the state suppressed testimony from a psychologist who found that Willis was not dangerous to society. The Texas attorney general and the Pecos County district attorney declined to pursue the case further. The DA said that new investigators labeled the fire's cause as undetermined and could not find any evidence to substantiate an arson case. Willis was released from prison in October 2004. Willis was the eighth Texas death row inmate exonerated since the state resumed executions in 1982, and he was thought to have served the longest sentence on death row among that group.

After his release from prison, Willis and his wife moved to Mississippi, where they mostly kept a low profile. He started his own business hauling houses and boats across the United States. Willis considered writing a book about his experiences, but he never did so. Willis and his wife separated in 2007 and he moved to Midland, Texas. In 2012, when the family of executed Texas inmate Cameron Todd Willingham announced that they would attempt to have Willingham posthumously pardoned, Willis attended the press conference in Austin. By that time, he had gotten back together with his wife and was living in Mississippi again. 

Willis died on January 7, 2021.

See also 
 List of exonerated death row inmates (United States)

Notes

References

Living people
Overturned convictions in the United States
American people wrongfully convicted of murder
People paroled from death sentence
1945 births